Welcome to the Show may refer to:

 Welcome to the Show (TV series), a 2011 South Korean TV series
 Welcome to the Show (Evil Masquerade album), 2004
 "Welcome to the Show" (Adam Lambert song), 2016